Ayun may refer to:

'Ayūn, a component or Arabic placenames meaning springs, fountains, sources
 An alternative form of El Aaiún, a city in Western Sahara
 Ayun (woreda), a district of Somali Region, Ethiopia
 Ayun, Chitral, a village in Pakistan
 Ayun Halliday (born 1965), American writer and actor

See also 
 
 Aioun (disambiguation)
 El Aioun (disambiguation)